Hydrobiidae, commonly known as mud snails, is a large cosmopolitan family of very small freshwater and brackish water snails with an operculum; they are in the order Littorinimorpha.

Distribution 
Hydrobiidae are found in much of the world, inhabiting all continents except Antarctica. In Australia alone there are over 260 species in the family.

Description 
These are very small or minute snails, with a shell height of less than 8 mm. The dextrally-coiled shells are smooth (except for growth lines conforming to the shape of the outer lip) and are usually rather nondescript. The shell offers very few robust characteristics to the systematist who is attempting to classify the species within this family. This difficulty is compounded by a high degree of intraspecific variation. Descriptions often have to be based on the characteristics of the operculum, radula and penis.

The shell of species within this family varies from planispiral to needle-shaped. The shell may have an open umbilicus or a plugged umbilicus. The thickness of the shell can vary from thin to fairly solid. The shell may be transparent and horn-colored, or colorless.

The number of whorls in the shell varies between two and eight. The shell can sometimes even assume a corkscrew or hornlike shape by loosening of the attachment of body whorl. The periostracum (outer layer of the shell) is usually thin, and is often colored. It can sometimes show hair-like projections.

The sinuous aperture is entire, not interrupted by a siphonal canal or other extensions. It is sometimes thickened. The protoconch is usually shaped like a dome, and usually shows a few spirals.

The corneous operculum is usually well-formed and shows only a few spirals.

The head, foot, mantle and visceral coil are colored pale gray to dark purple-black with melanin pigments. Subterranean species are often unpigmented.

The strong foot can be retracted into the shell. The mucous glands are situated at the anterior edge of the foot. There are no posterior mucous glands. The symmetrical cephalic tentacles are threadlike, with blunt or rounded tips. The eyes are located at the base of the tentacles.

The ctenidium (a comblike respiratory apparatus) goes along most of the length of the pallial cavity. This respiratory gill consists of 10 to 200 triangular filaments. The osphradium, the olfactory organ linked with the respiration organ, is usually relatively small.

The taenioglossate radula consists of more than fifty rows of teeth. The central tooth is trapezoidal. The lateral teeth have few to numerous cusps. The marginal teeth are usually with numerous cusps.

The species usually have both male and female individuals, but very rarely reproduction may be parthenogenic, caused by internal fertilization. The females lay eggs in single capsules on the leaves or stems of water plants. But sometimes they produce eggs that are hatched within the pallial gonoduct of the body, and in these cases the young are born alive. Species that inhabit estuaries sometimes produce veliger larvae.

The fossil record of this family extends back to the Early Carboniferous.

Ecology

Habitat 
Most species of this family live in freshwater (lakes, ponds, rivers, streams), but some are found in brackish water or at the borders between freshwater and brackish water. A few occur in marine environments on sandy or muddy bottoms between algae and sea grass.

Feeding habits 
These small snails feed on algae, diatoms and detritus.

Taxonomy 
This is the largest family within the superfamily Truncatelloidea. At one time or another some 400 genera have been assigned to this family, and probably more than 1,000 species. The Hydrobiidae family is the most widespread and diverse family of freshwater molluscs in the world, occupying a range of habitats from streams and estuarine creeks to alpine bogs.

This family was originally named by Troschel in 1857, as the group Hydrobiae. Troschel was not certain of their rank, and he placed them in the Taenioglossata: Ctenobranchiata between the Lithoglyphi and Ancyloti. Over the years there have been numerous attempts to give an adequate and more finely divided classification. Thiele (1925, 1929 and 1931) set up the most comprehensive classification, with a review of the family at generic level.

Notable works about taxonomy of Hydrobiidae includes works by Radoman, for example Radoman (1983).

The classification, as specified by Kabat and Hershler (1993), does not form a monophyletic group, and was in need of revision.

A study by Wilke et al. (2001) using molecular data from COI (Cytochrome c oxidase subunit I) and 18S genes has resulted in a new tentative set of subfamilies: Hydrobiinae, Pseudamnicolinae, Nymphophilinae, Islamiinae and Horatiinae.

2005 taxonomy 
The following subfamilies are recognized in the gastropod taxonomy of Bouchet & Rocroi from 2005:
 Hydrobiinae Stimpson, 1865 – synonyms: Paludestrinidae Newton, 1891; Pyrgorientaliinae Radoman, 1977; Pseudocaspiidae Sitnikova & Starobogatov, 1983
 Belgrandiinae de Stefani, 1877 – synonyms: Horatiini D. W. Taylor, 1966; Sadlerianinae Radoman, 1973; Pseudohoratiinae Radoman, 1973; Orientaliidae Radoman, 1973 (inv.); Lithoglyphulidae Radoman, 1973; Orientalinidae Radoman, 1978 (inv.); Belgrandiellinae Radoman, 1983; Dabrianidae Starobogatov, 1983; Istrianidae Starobogatov, 1983; Kireliinae Starobogatov, 1983; lanzaiidae Starobogatov, 1983; Tanousiidae Starobogatov, 1983; Bucharamnicolinae Izzatulaev, Sitnikova & Starobogatov, 1985; Martensamnicolinae Izzatulaev, Sitnikova & Starobogatov, 1985; Turkmenamnicolinae Izzatulaev, Sitnikova & Starobogatov, 1985
 Clenchiellinae D. W. Taylor, 1966
 Islamiinae Radoman, 1973
 Nymphophilinae D. W. Taylor, 1966
 Pseudamnicolinae Radoman, 1977
 Pyrgulinae Brusina, 1882 (1869) – synonyms: Caspiidae B. Dybowski, 1913; Microliopalaeinae B. Dybowski & Grochmalicki, 1914; Micromelaniidae B. Dybowski & Grochmalicki, 1914; Turricaspiinae B. Dybowski & Grochmalicki, 1915; Liosarmatinae B. Dybowski & Grochmalicki, 1920; Chilopyrgulinae Radoman, 1973; Micropyrgulidae Radoman, 1973; Falsipyrgulinae Radoman, 1983; Ohridopyrgulinae Radoman, 1983; Prosostheniinae Pana, 1989
 Tateinae Thiele, 1925 – synonyms: Potamopyrgidae F. C. Baker, 1928; Hemistomiinae Thiele, 1929

The Amnicolidae and Cochliopidae are considered as distinct families according to the taxonomy of Bouchet & Rocroi (2005).

Genera 
 Belgrandiellinae Radoman, 1983
Arganiella Giusti & Pezzoli, 1980
 Balkanica Georgiev, 2011
 Balkanospeum Georgiev, 2012
 Belgrandiella A. J. Wagner, 1928
 Boleana Radoman, 1975
 Bythiospeum Bourguignat, 1882
 Cavernisa Radoman, 1978
 Cilgia Schütt, 1968
 Costellina Kuščer, 1933
 Devetakia Georgiev & Glöer, 2011
 Devetakiola Georgiev, 2017
 Graziana Radoman, 1975
 Heraultiella Bodon, Manganelli & Giusti, 2002
 Insignia Angelov, 1972
 Istriana Velkovrh, 1971
 Iverakia Glöer & Pešić, 2014
 Kerkia Radoman, 1978
 Kolevia Georgiev & Glöer, 2015
 Lanzaia Brusina, 1906
 Lanzaiopsis Bole, 1989
 Meyrargueria Girardi, 2009
 Microstygia Georgiev & Glöer, 2015
 Palacanthilhiopsis Bernasconi, 1988
 Phreatica Velkovrh, 1970
 Plagigeyeria Tomlin, 1930
 Pontobelgrandiella Radoman, 1978
 Sarajana Radoman, 1975
 Saxurinator Schütt, 1960
 Stoyanovia Georgiev, 2017
 Zeteana Glöer & Pešić, 2014
 Belgrandiinae de Stefani, 1877
 Agrafia Szarowska & Falniowski, 2011
 Antibaria Radoman, 1983
 Belchatovia Kadolsky & Piechocki, 2000 †
 Belgrandia Bourguignat, 1870
 Bracenica Radoman, 1973
 Cyclothyrella Neubauer, Mandic, Harzhauser & Hrvatović, 2013 †
 Dalmatella Velkovrh, 1970
 Dalmatinella Radoman, 1973
 Daphniola Radoman, 1973
 Gloeria Georgiev, Dedov & Cheshmedjiev, 2012
 Gocea Hadžišče, 1956
 Graecoanatolica Radoman, 1973
 Graecorientalia Radoman, 1983
 Grossuana Radoman, 1983
 Guadiella Boeters, 2003
 Hadziella Kuščer, 1932
 Hauffenia Pollonera, 1898
 Isimerope Radea & Parmakelis, 2013
 Karucia Glöer & Pešić, 2013
 Litthabitella Boeters, 1970
 Lyhnidia Radoman, 1962
 Malaprespia Radoman, 1973
 Martinietta Schlickum, 1974 †
 Microprososthenia Kadolsky & Piechocki, 2000 †
 Montenegrospeum Pešić & Glöer, 2013
 Myrtoessa Radea, 2016
 Narentiana Radoman, 1973
 Ohridohauffenia Hadžišče, 1959
 Ohridohoratia Hadžišče, 1959
 Ohrigocea Hadžišče, 1959
 Plesiella Boeters, 2003
 Prespiana Radoman, 1973
 Prespolitorea Radoman, 1983
 Pseudavenionia Bodon & Giusti, 1982
 Pseudohoratia Radoman, 1967
 Pseudoislamia Radoman, 1979
 Strugia Radoman, 1973
 Sumia Glöer & Mrkvicka, 2015
 Tarraconia Ramos & Arconada, 2000
 Terranigra Radoman, 1978
 Trichonia Schütt, 1980
 Turcorientalia Radoman, 1973
 Zaumia Radoman, 1983
 Caspiinae B. Dybowski, 1913
 Caspia Clessin & W. Dybowski, 1887
 Horatiinae D.W. Taylor, 1966
 Anagastina Radoman, 1978
 Graecoarganiella Falniowski & Szarowska, 2011
 Horatia Bourguignat, 1887
 Pezzolia Bodon & Giusti, 1986
 Radomaniola Szarowska, 2007
 Sadleriana Clessin, 1890
 Sardohoratia Manganelli, Bodon, Cianfanelli, Talenti & Giusti, 1998
 Tanousia Servain, 1881
 Vinodolia Radoman, 1973

 Hydrobiinae Stimpson, 1865
 Adriohydrobia Radoman, 1977
 Ecrobia Stimpson, 1865
 Hydrobia W. Hartmann, 1821
 Peringia Paladilhe, 1874
 Romania Cossmann, 1913 †
 Salenthydrobia Wilke, 2003
 Nymphophilinae
 Birgella Baker, 1926
 Incertae sedis
 Anatolidamnicola Şahin, Koca & Yildirim, 2012
 Andrusovia Brusina in Westerlund, 1902
 Antillobia Altaba, 1993
 Arabiella Kadolsky, Harzhauser & Neubauer in Harzhauser et al., 2016 †
 Austropyrgus Cotton, 1942
 Baglivia Brusina, 1892 †
 Bania Brusina, 1896 †
 Beogradica Pavlović, 1927 †
 Brasovia Neubauer, Kroh, Harzhauser, Georgopoulou & Mandic, 2015 †
 Bullaregia Khalloufi, Béjaoui & Delicado, 2017
 Caspiohydrobia Starobogatov, 1970
 Chirgisia Glöer, Boeters & Pešić, 2014
 Coelacanthia Andrusov, 1890 †
 Ctyrokya Schlickum, 1965 †
 Fonscochlea Ponder, Hershler & Jenkins, 1989
 Goniochilus Sandberger, 1875 †
 Gyromelania Wenz, 1939 †
 Heterocyclus Crosse, 1872
 Rifia Ghamizi, 2020
 Illyricella Neubauer, Mandic & Harzhauser, 2016 †
 Intermaria Delicado, Pešić & Glöer, 2016
 Iraklimelania Willmann, 1981 †
 Jekeliella Bandel, 2010 †
 Kadolskya Neubauer & Harzhauser, 2016 †
 Kaskakia Glöer & Pešić, 2012
 Kerchia Bandel, 2010 †
 Lisinskia Brusina, 1897 †
 Littoridinops Pilsbry, 1952
 Lutetiella Kadolsky, 2015 †
 Microbeliscus Sandberger, 1875 †
 Micromelania Brusina, 1874 †
 Mikrogoniochilus Willmann, 1981 †
 Motsametia Vinarski, Palatov & Glöer, 2014
 Muellerpalia Bandel, 2010 †
 Navalis Quiñonero-Salgado & Rolán, 2017
 Nematurella Sandberger, 1875 †
 Neohoratia Schütt, 1961
 Nicolaia Glöer, Bößneck, Walther & Neiber, 2016
 Odontohydrobia Pavlović, 1927 †
 Parhydrobia Cossmann & Dollfus, 1913
 Persipyrgula Delicado, Pešić & Glöer, 2016
 Pontohoratia Vinarski, Palatov & Glöer, 2014
 Pontohydrobia Badzoshvili, 1979 †
 Probythinella Thiele, 1928
 Prososthenia Neumayr, 1869 †
 Pseudamnicola Paulucci, 1878
 Pseudocaspia Starobogatov, 1972
 Pseudopaludinella Mabille, 1877
 Pyrgulella Harzhauser, Neubauer & Kadolsky in Harzhauser et al., 2016 †
 Rhodopyrgula Willmann, 1981 †
 Robicia Brusina, 1897 †
 Saccoia Brusina, 1893 †
 Salakosia Willmann, 1981 †
 Salalahia Kadolsky, Harzhauser & Neubauer in Harzhauser et al., 2016 †
 Sarkhia Glöer & Pešić, 2012
 Scalimelania Wenz, 1939 †
 Sellia Raincourt, 1884
 Shadinia Akramowski, 1976
 Sivasi Şahin, Koca & Yildirim, 2012
 Socenia Jekelius, 1944 †
 Staja Brusina, 1897 †
 Stalioa Brusina, 1870 †
 Staliopsis Rzehak, 1893 †
 Tefennia Schütt & Yildirim, 2003
 Torosia Glöer & Georgiev, 2012
 Tournouerina Schlickum, 1971 †
 Vrazia Brusina, 1897 †
 Wuconcha Kang, 1983
 Xestopyrguloides Willmann, 1981 †
 Islamiinae Radoman, 1973
 Alzoniella Giusti & Bodon, 1984
 Avenionia Nicolas, 1882
 Boetersiella Arconada & Ramos, 2001
 Chondrobasis Arconada & Ramos, 2001
 Corbellaria Callot-Girardi & Boeters, 2012
 Fissuria Boeters, 1981
 Iberhoratia Arconada & Ramos, 2007
 Islamia Radoman, 1973
 Josefus Arconada & Ramos, 2006
 Milesiana Arconada & Ramos, 2006
 Pauluccinella Giusti & Pezzoli, 1990
 Spathogyna Arconada & Ramos, 2002
 Mercuriinae Boeters & Falkner, 2017
 Mercuria Boeters, 1971
 Pseudamnicolinae Radoman, 1977
 Corrosella Boeters, 1970
 Diegus Delicado, Machordom & Ramos, 2016
 Falniowskia Bernasconi, 1991
 Graecamnicola Willmann, 1981 †
 Pyrgulinae E. von Martens, 1858
 Chilopyrgula Brusina, 1896
 Dianella Gude, 1913
 Ginaia Brusina, 1896
 Laevicaspia Dybowski & Grochmalicki, 1917
 Maeotidia Andrusov, 1890 †
 Marticia Brusina, 1897 †
 Micropyrgula Polinski, 1929
 Neofossarulus Poliński, 1929
 Ohridopyrgula Radoman, 1983
 Pseudodianella Neubauer, Mandic, Harzhauser & Hrvatović, 2013 †
 Pyrgohydrobia Radoman, 1955
 Pyrgula de Cristofori & Jan, 1832
 Stankovicia Poliński, 1929
 Trachyochridia Poliński, 1929
 Turricaspia B. Dybowski & Grochmalicki, 1915
 Xestopyrgula Poliński, 1929

Notes

References

External links 
 

 
Taxa named by William Stimpson